Sants-Montjuïc is one of the ten districts into which Barcelona has been split since 1984, numbered District 3. Comprising very different areas of the city, it covers the southern part of Barcelona, joining the two former districts II (made up by Montjuïc and Poble-Sec) and VII (Sants ― Hostafrancs ― La Bordeta), as well as the different areas comprised in the Zona Franca. As of the 2005, census it had a population of 177,636. It borders Les Corts, Eixample, Ciutat Vella, and the municipalities L'Hospitalet de Llobregat and El Prat de Llobregat.

It was one of the former municipalities added to Barcelona. The former municipality had the main nucleus in the neighbourhood of Sants but other current neighbourhoods of the district belonged to that municipality.

Within the limits of the neighborhood is Calle de la Creu Coberta, famous for its many shops. The Emperador Carles institute and the Joan Pelegrí school are located there, as well as the Montserrat Institution.

Neighbourhoods
 La Bordeta
 La Font de la Guatlla
 Hostafrancs
 La Marina de Port
 La Marina del Prat Vermell
 El Poble-sec
 Sants
 Sants-Badal
 Montjuïc*
 Zona Franca - Port*

(*) Not properly a neighbourhood, since they have no inhabitants, but they are part of the district not included in other neighbourhoods.

See also
Districts of Barcelona
Barcelona Sants railway station
Avinguda de Josep Tarradellas, Barcelona

 Street names in Barcelona
 Urban planning of Barcelona

External links

BarriSants.org News and information internet portal related to Sants
Sants-Montjuïc at the city council site

 
Districts of Barcelona